Giuseppe "Peppino" Tanti  (born 24 August 1941) is a retired Italian featherweight weightlifter who won a bronze medal at the 1970 World Championships. He competed at the 1972 and 1976 Summer Olympics and finished in 8th and 10th place, respectively.

References

1941 births
Living people
Olympic weightlifters of Italy
Weightlifters at the 1972 Summer Olympics
Italian male weightlifters
Weightlifters at the 1976 Summer Olympics
20th-century Italian people